is a Japanese visual kei rock band formed in January 1997.

History 
DuelJewel began in 1997; during their early beginnings they released several demos.  The vocalist Hayato joined in 1997, left, and returned in 1999.  The band released their first album in 2001 and Natsuki joined in 2002 when Ka-non left the band. They performed at A-Kon (an anime convention) in Dallas, Texas in 2002, which was their first international concert.  They returned to the United States, playing in Washington, D.C., Chicago, Anaheim, San Jose, and Houston through the rest of the year and into 2003.

The band continued to tour in Japan, gaining a larger fanbase, and in May 2007, the band performed at the sold-out two-day JRock Revolution concert held in Los Angeles, CA. On July 11, 2007, they released their first single on Universal, "Es."

They played in the V-Rock Festival alongside many other bands.

In 2010 DuelJewel became signed by Maru Music and Gan-Shin and released a USA and European exclusive album entitled "We Will Melt You" on September 17, 2010.

In 2016 DuelJewel disbanded citing issues that Hayato had been experiencing with regards to "functional dysphonia". However in late 2018 the band announced that, with Hayato having made a full recovery, they would perform at Zepp Tokyo on March 1, 2019. Since then, the band have made various appearances together on social media platforms such as Youtube.

Profile 
Hayato (隼人) - vocals
Shun - guitar, backup vocals
Yuya (祐弥) - guitar
Natsuki - bass
Val (ばる) - drums
Val changed his stagename to Baru (ばる) in 2004. However, he still introduces himself as Val in English-speaking countries.

Past members 
Psy - bass (January 1997 - July 1998)
Takashi - guitar (June 1997 - March 1999)
ka-non - bass (January 1999 - December 2001)

Name 
When Shun and Val formed DuelJewel, they had narrowed the possibilities for name to two. Unable to choose between them, they combined them into DuelJewel. Fans have speculated on the meaning of the band's name, but in an interview with JaME in 2007, Val stated that there was none.

Discography

Albums
2001: Lapidary
2002: Noah
2006: Visions
2007: Bullet
2008: Glass Sphere (グラスフィア)
2010: Will
2010: ｢Zero｣
2011: Luminous
2014: Story
2015: Duel
2015: Jewel

Compilations
2009: "Revive"
2010: "We Will Melt You"
Special edition, released only in Europe

Omnibus
2000: "Stoning2"
2001: "Make an Epoch"
2001: "Make an Epoch 2"
2003: "Loop of Life III"
2004: "Hysteric Media Zone V"
2004: "Decadence 2004 ～Spleen & Ideal～"
2005: "Cannonball Vol.2"
2005: "Shock Edge 2005"

Demo Tapes
1998: "Kaze ～The Winding Garden～" (風～The Winding Garden～)
2000: "Kuro" (黒)
2000: "Shiro" (白)
2000: "Chinmoku" (沈黙)

Singles
2003: "Sepia"
2003: "Vermillion"
2004: "Nauthiz"
2005: "The Birth"
2006: "Azure"
2006: "Aishuu Melancholia/Life On..." (愛愁メランコリア)
2007: "Es"
2008: "Iolite" (アイオライト)
2011: "Vamp Ash"
2011: "Polaris"
2013: "It's just love"
2014: "Chronos"
2015: "Yuki no Asterisk" (雪のアスタリスク)

DVDs
2008: Jewelry Box
2011: Dear Lapidary

References

External links 
 
 Hayato's Blog
 Shun's Blog
 Yuya's Blog
 Natsuki's Blog
 Val's Blog

Gan-Shin artists
Visual kei musical groups
Japanese alternative rock groups
Japanese hard rock musical groups
Musical groups established in 1997
Musical groups from Tokyo